Patrick John Boen (born March, 1967) is a baseball coach and former shortstop, who is the current head baseball coach of the Stonehill Skyhawks. He played college baseball at Stonehill from 1986 to 1989. He also was a point guard on the Stonehill men's basketball team.

Playing career
Boen grew up in Brockton, Massachusetts, where he attended Brockton High School, where he was a letterwinner for the Boxers in baseball. He also participated in basketball, where he help lead the Boxers to a state championship as a senior in 1985. Boen would go on to attend Stonehill College, where he would play both basketball and baseball.

Coaching career
Boen registered his 600th career victory on March 8, 2022 with a 17–6 win over Bloomfield. In 2022, Stonehill announced it would be moving to Division I for athletics, Boen will lead the Skyhawks into the Northeast Conference in 2023.

Head coaching record

References

External links
Stonehill Skyhawks bio

1967 births
Living people
Stonehill Skyhawks baseball coaches
Stonehill Skyhawks baseball players
Stonehill Skyhawks men's basketball players
Sportspeople from Brockton, Massachusetts
Baseball coaches from Massachusetts